Chuang Chia-jung (born 10 January 1985) is a Taiwanese former tennis player.

In her career, she won 22 doubles titles on the WTA Tour and three doubles titles on tournaments of the WTA Challenger Tour, as well as ten singles titles and 33 doubles titles on the ITF Circuit. On 13 November 2006, she reached a career-high singles ranking of world No. 177. On 18 August 2008, she peaked at No. 5 in the WTA doubles rankings.

On 28 October 2018, Chuang announced her retirement from professional tennis and her marriage via Instagram.

Career
At the 2007 Australian Open, Chuang reached the final of the women's doubles tournament with her partner Chan Yung-jan that they lost in three sets to Cara Black and Liezel Huber. She also reached the women's doubles final of the 2007 US Open.

In 2001, Chuang played for the first time for the Chinese Taipei Fed Cup team. Her win–loss record in Fed Cup is 26–11.

Biography
Chuang was coached by her father Chuang Wen-teng. Her mother Xie Xiu-ling is a pharmacist. Chuang's favorite surface is hardcourt, and her best shot is her serve. She started playing tennis at age seven when introduced to it by her father. She speaks Mandarin, English, and Taiwanese.

Grand Slam finals

Doubles: 2 (runner-ups)

Grand Slam performance timelines

Doubles

Mixed doubles

WTA career finals

Doubles: 36 (22 titles, 14 runner-ups)

WTA Challenger finals

Doubles: 5 (3 titles, 2 runner-ups)

ITF Circuit finals

Singles: 15 (10–5)

Doubles: 48 (33–15)

References

External links

 
 
 

1985 births
Living people
Asian Games medalists in tennis
Olympic tennis players of Taiwan
Sportspeople from Kaohsiung
Taiwanese female tennis players
Tennis players at the 2008 Summer Olympics
Tennis players at the 2010 Asian Games
Tennis players at the 2012 Summer Olympics
Tennis players at the 2002 Asian Games
Tennis players at the 2006 Asian Games
Asian Games gold medalists for Chinese Taipei
Asian Games silver medalists for Chinese Taipei
Asian Games bronze medalists for Chinese Taipei
Medalists at the 2002 Asian Games
Medalists at the 2006 Asian Games
Medalists at the 2010 Asian Games
Universiade medalists in tennis
Universiade gold medalists for Chinese Taipei
Universiade bronze medalists for Chinese Taipei
Medalists at the 2003 Summer Universiade
Medalists at the 2005 Summer Universiade
Medalists at the 2007 Summer Universiade
Medalists at the 2009 Summer Universiade